Cartridge belt may refer to:

Belt (firearm), a belt for automatic feeding of ammunition into a firearm
Bandolier, a wearable belt with pockets for cartridges